A župa (or zhupa, županija) is a historical type of administrative division in Southeast Europe and Central Europe, that originated in medieval South Slavic culture, commonly translated as "parish", later synonymous "kotar", commonly translated as "county". It was mentioned for the first time in the eighth century. It was initially used by the South and West Slavs, denoting various territorial units of which the leader was the župan. In modern Bosnian, Croatian and Slovenian, the term župa also means an ecclesiastical parish, while term županija is used in Bosnia and Croatia (in Bosnia also kanton as synonymous) for lower state organizational units.

Etymology
It is mostly translated into "county" or "district". According to Kmietowicz, it seems that the territorial organization had been created in Polish territories before the Slav Migrations. Some Slavic nations changed its name into "opole", "okolina", "kraj" and "vierw", but it has survived in župan. Some scholars consider the word's older meaning was "open area in the valley". This interpretation is confirmed by the Bulgarian župa (tomb), Polish zupa and Ukrainian župa (salt mine), and Old Slavonic župište (tomb). However, Albert Bruckner suggested the opposite evolution; župa as a back formation from title župan (for the etymology see corresponding article), which is a borrowing from Iranian languages (*fsu-pāna, "shepherd").

Usage
The division had a widespread distribution and did not always had a concrete institutional definition. The term župa was at first the territorial and administrative unit of a tribe but was later only an administrative unit without tribal features. The South Slavs that settled in Roman lands to a certain degree adopted Roman state organization, but retained their own tribal organization. Slavic tribes were divided into fraternities, each including a certain number of families. The territory inhabited by a tribe was a župa, and its leader was the župan.

The zhupa (plural zhupi) was an administrative unit in the First Bulgarian Empire, a subdivision of a larger unit called comitatus.  In these countries, the equivalent of "county" is "judet" (from Latin judicium). The Croats and the Slovaks used the terms županija and župa for the counties in the Kingdom of Croatia and Kingdom of Hungary. German language translation of the word for those counties was komitat (from Latin comitatus, "countship") during the Middle Ages, but later it was gespanschaft (picking up the span root that previously came from župan).

Bosnia

Territorial-political organization in medieval Bosnia was intricate, and composed on several levels. In this scheme in the territorial-political organizational order of the medieval Bosnian state, župa or parish was basic unit of the state organization, with feudal estate at the bottom, followed by village municipality, both below župa, and county or zemlja above it, with the state monarch at the top.

Croatia

The Croatian word župa signifies both a secular unit (county) and a religious unit (parish), ruled over by a "župan" (count) and "župnik" (parish priest).

Croatian medieval state was divided into eleven ζουπανίας (zoupanias; župas), and the ban ruled over additional three župas Krbava, Lika, and Gacka).

Today the term županija is the name for the Croatian regional government, the counties of Croatia. Mayors of counties hold the title of župan (pl. župani), which is usually translated as "county prefect". In the 19th century, the counties of the Kingdom of Croatia-Slavonia were called županija. The Croats preserved the term župa until the modern times as the name for local clerical units, parishes of the Catholic Church and of the Protestant churches. The parish priest is called župnik.

Hungary

In c. 1074, the župa is mentioned in Hungary as -spán, also as határispánságok (march, frontier county). The derivative titles were ispán, nominated by the king for not defined time, and gradually replaced by főispán in the 18-19th century; megyésispán, also nominated by the king but could be expelled anytime; alispán was the leader of the jurisdiction in the county if the 'megyésispán' was not available; várispán was more linked to the "vár" (fortress) in Hungary in the times of Árpád.

Serbia

The Serbs in the Early Middle Ages were organized into župe, a confederation of village communities (roughly the equivalent of a county), headed by a local župan (a magistrate or governor). Thus the title of Grand Župan in Raška in 11th-12th century meant "supreme župan" of župans who ruled over župas.

Dušan's Code (1349) named the administrative hierarchy as following: "land(s), city(ies), župa(s) and krajište(s)", the župa(s) and krajište(s) were one and the same, with the župa on the border were called krajište (frontier). The župa consisted of villages, and their status, rights and obligations were regulated in the constitution. The ruling nobility possessed hereditary allodial estates, which were worked by dependent sebri, the equivalent of Greek paroikoi; peasants owing labour services, formally bound by decree.

Though the territorial unit today is unused, there are a number of traditional župe in Kosovo, around Prizren: Sredačka Župa, Sirinićka Župa, Gora, Opolje and Prizrenski Podgor. The Serbian language maintains the word in toponyms, the best known being that of the Župa Aleksandrovačka.

Slovakia
The term župa was popularized in Slovak professional literature in the 19th century as a synonym to contemporary Slovak term stolica (county). After the collapse of the Austro-Hungarian Monarchy, it was used as the official name of administrative units of Slovakia within Czechoslovakia in 1919 – 1928 and then again in the Slovak Republic during WWII in 1940–1945. Nowadays, the term is used semi-officially as a short alternative name for the self-governing regions of Slovakia. The president of the self-governing region is semi-officially called župan.

Slovenia
During World War II, when Slovenia was partitioned between Italy, Hungary, and Germany on 17 April 1941, in the Italian portion, named province of Ljubljana, the new administration was led by an Italian High Commissioner, but there also were Presidents of the Council of Zhupans of Ljubljana: Marko Natlačen (1941), Leon Rupnik (1942-1943).

See also
 Grand Župan, a Serbian medieval title (equivalent to Grand Prince)
 Gespan
 Ban
 Gau
 Shire

Citations

Sources

Former types of subdivisions of Bosnia and Herzegovina
Former types of subdivisions of Serbia
Slavic culture
Slavic history
Subdivisions of Croatia
Subdivisions of Serbia
Subdivisions of Slovakia
Subdivisions of Slovenia
Types of administrative division